Mubanga is a surname of Zambian origin that may refer to:

Hellen Mubanga (born 1995), Zambian footballer  
M. K. Mubanga, Southern African politician
Martin Mubanga, Zambian extrajudicial prisoner of the United States
Perry Mubanga, Zambian football defender

Zambian surnames
Bemba-language surnames